Baghawan ward no 14, sub-metropolitan Kalaiya Bara, Nepal. 
Baghawan is a town and Sub metropolitan Ward no 14 Kalaiya Bara. Baghawan is lies between Kalaiya and Gadhimai temple. It's a village 3 km far from the city, kalaiya Bara District in the Narayani Zone of south-eastern Nepal. 
The famous and biggest  Fair of  Nepal is 'Gadhi Mai' fair which is just 2 km far from Baghawn. At the time of the 2011 Nepal census it had a population of 4,678 people living in 761 individual households. There were 2,315 males and 2,363 at the time of census.

References

External links
UN map of the municipalities of Bara District

Populated places in Bara District